was a Japanese Buddhist scholar.

Together with Hajime Nakamura and others, he translated the Heart Sutra, the Prajnaparamita sutras, and the three main sutras of the Jodo sect.

Life 
Born the son of the head priest of Kempon Hokke Myorenji Temple in Yamaguchi Prefecture, Kino moved at the age of four to Hiroshima Prefecture, to Honshoji (temple), when his father became head priest there.

While he was a second year student at the School of Indian Philosophy, Literature Department, Imperial University of Tokyo, he was drafted into the Imperial Japanese Army. At the end of World War II, in 1945, he was taken prisoner in Taiwan. In the same year his family died in the atomic bombing of Hiroshima. He was repatriated in 1946, resumed his studies and graduated in 1948.

In the 1990s he became president of Hosen Gakuen College, Tokyo. He was also vice-president of Shogen Junior College in Minokamo, Gifu.

He had his own radio show called Kino Kazuyoshi no sekai ("Kazuyoshi Kino's World") on Radio Nikkei.

He died on December 28, 2013, of pneumonia.

Awards
1958- Indian Buddhist Society Award (印度学仏教学会賞)
1967- Traditional Buddhist Culture Award (仏教伝道文化賞)

Writings (selection) 
 Hokekyō no tankyū (『法華経の探求』), Heirakuji Shōten, 1962 
 Zen : gendai ni ikiru mono (『禅 現代に生きるもの』), Nihon hōsō Shuppan Kyōkai, 1966  
 Inochi no sekai Hokekyō (『いのちの世界-法華経』), 1965
 Meisō retsuden (『名僧列伝』1-4),  Bungeishunju, 1973－78　
 Hokekyō no fūkō (『法華経の風光』), 5 volumes, Mizu Shobō, 1976－77　  
 Hannya shingyō" o yomu　(「般若心経」を読), Kodansha gendai shinsho, 1981  
 "Hokekyo" o yomu (法華経」を読む), Kodansha gendai shinsho 1982
 Hannya shingyo kogi  (般若心経講義), PHP kenkyujo, 1983　　
 "Tannisho" kogi (「歎異抄」講義』), PHP kenkyujo, 1984
 Kenji no shinpi (賢治の神秘) Kosei Shuppansha, 1985 (Miyazawa Kenji dowa no sekai series (宮沢賢治童話の世界)  
 Shinran ni manabu (『親鸞に学ぶ』), Nihon Hōsō Shuppan Kyōkai, 1988  
 Bukkyo no kiiwado (仏教のキイ・ワード), Kodansha gendai shinsho, 1988

Lecture CDs
 Shōbō Genzō ni manabu (『正法眼蔵に学ぶ』), 2008
 Kaze ni kiki mizu ni tou (『風に聴き水に問う』), 2008
 Ee naa! Ee naa! Ee naa!～ Kyūdai Hokekyo no kokoro (『ええなあ！ええなあ！ええなあ！～)旧題法華経のこころ』), 2008

References

External links 
Resources Kazuyoshi Kogi at National Library of Australia
Interview 
An article by Kino in NHK Plus 35 
 CiNii>紀野一義 Articles, etc.   
 INBUDS>紀野一義 Articles, etc.   

Japanese scholars of Buddhism
People from Yamaguchi Prefecture
People from Hiroshima Prefecture
1922 births
2013 deaths
Deaths from pneumonia in Japan
University of Tokyo alumni
Imperial Japanese Army personnel of World War II
Japanese prisoners of war